Artur Olegovich Gladyshev (born January 1, 1968, in Dushanbe USSR (now in Tajikistan)) is a Russian singer. He lives in Moscow and in Sosnovoborsk. He is the author of over 70 songs and has produced several albums, among which are:

 "New Gymnastics" – Moscow, 1988
 "Lady at the Wheel" – Moscow, 1995
 "Red America" ( – Moscow, 1997

He participated as drummer in Sergei Kosygin's album Kamchadaly, Moscow, 1996.

Artur Gladyshev is the author of the book Who does not know, that such summers exist in Siberia , published in Moscow in 1998. The book narrates an excursion by boat on the Mana River.

References 

1968 births
Living people
People from Dushanbe
Russian bards
Soviet musicians